The 2013–14 Indiana Hoosiers men's basketball team represented Indiana University in the 2013–14 NCAA Division I men's basketball season. Their head coach was Tom Crean, in his sixth season with the Hoosiers. The team played its home games at Assembly Hall in Bloomington, Indiana, and was a member of the Big Ten Conference. They finished the season 17–15, 7–11 in Big Ten play to finish in a tie for eighth place. They lost in the first round of the Big Ten tournament to Illinois. After not being selected to play in the NIT, Indiana chose not to accept an invitation to the CBI claiming, "We're Indiana. We don't play in the CBI".

Previous season
The Hoosiers finished the season with an overall record of 29–7, with a record of 14–4 in the Big Ten regular season for a first-place finish. Indiana started the preseason ranked #1 overall and spent a total of 10 weeks at #1. Indiana earned a 1 seed in the NCAA Tournament's East Region which they lost in the Sweet Sixteen to Syracuse.

Preseason

Departures

Recruiting class
In addition to the six incoming freshmen recruits, Indiana is also adding Evan Gordon, a graduate transfer from Arizona State. He is eligible to play immediately.

Roster

Schedule

|-
!colspan=12 style="background:#7D110C; color:white;"| Exhibition

|-
!colspan=12 style="background:#7D110C; color:white;"| Non-conference regular season

|-
!colspan=12 style="background:#7D110C; color:white;"| Big Ten regular season

|-
!colspan=12 style="background:#7D110C; color:white;"| Big Ten tournament

^ This game was originally scheduled for Feb 18, but was postponed due to safety concerns following a piece of metal falling from the roof at Assembly Hall. 
Source: Schedule

Rankings

See also
2013–14 Indiana Hoosiers women's basketball team

References

Indiana Hoosiers men's basketball seasons
Indiana
2013 in sports in Indiana
2014 in sports in Indiana